Paul Joseph Bertolli (born 1954) is a chef, writer, and artisan food producer in the San Francisco Bay Area, in California.

Biography  
Paul Bertolli was born in 1954 in San Rafael, California, to parents of Italian descent. He rose to prominence in the gourmet food world at Chez Panisse in nearby Berkeley, California, working from 1982 to 1992. He eventually became executive chef and co-authoring Chez Panisse Cooking with restaurant founder Alice Waters. He was later the executive chef of the Oliveto restaurant in Oakland, California, until mid-2005.

He is most known for producing handcrafted ingredients like balsamic vinegar and salumi (cured-pork products such as salami and prosciutto). He opened a food supplier, Fra' Mani Handcrafted Salumi, in March 2006 ('Fra Mani' is derived from the Italian for 'between or among hands'; and conveys the message 'from our hands to yours'). In 2003, he also authored, Cooking by Hand: A Cookbook.

References

External links
 Fra' Mani Salumi - official web site

Living people
American male chefs
American chefs
Writers from the San Francisco Bay Area
Cuisine of the San Francisco Bay Area
Place of birth missing (living people)
Businesspeople from the San Francisco Bay Area
James Beard Foundation Award winners
1954 births
Chefs from San Francisco
Chefs from Berkeley, California